Skal vi danse? returned for a fourth season on September 23, 2008 until November 11, 2008. Winners were Lene Alexandra Øien and Tom-Erik Nilsen of season 4. There are Super final winners that were Mona Grudt and Glenn Jørgen Sandaker on December 12, 2008. The super final winners were chosen by the judges depending on points.

Couples

Scoring chart

Highest and lowest scoring performances of the series 
The best and worst performances in each dance according to the judges' marks are as follows:

Dance schedule
The celebrities and professional partners danced one of these routines for each corresponding week.
 Week 1: Waltz, Rumba or Cha-Cha-Cha
 Week 2: Quickstep, Tango or Jive
 Week 3: Slowfox or Paso Doble
 Week 4: Samba 
 Week 5: One unlearned dance
 Week 6: Showdance
 Week 7: One unlearned dance
 Week 8: Two unlearned dances
 Week 9: One unlearned dance, one repeated dance
 Week 10: One ballroom dance, one Latin dance, Showdance

Songs

Week 1

Running order

Call-out Order
The table below lists the order in which the contestants' fates were revealed. The order of the safe couples doesn't reflect the viewer voting results.

 This couple came in first place with the judges.
 This couple came in last place with the judges.
 This couple came in last place with the judges and was eliminated.
 This couple withdrew from the competition.
 This couple was eliminated.
 This couple won the competition.
 This couple came in second in the competition.

Dance chart

 Highest scoring dance
 Lowest scoring dance

Super finals finale
On December 12, 2008 was held a great finale in Shall We Dance in which the winning pairs from the four previous seasons, participated. Since Tshawe Baqwa was on a concert tour at the time of the super-final took second pair from 2007 instead of the winning pair. Super Final was won by Mona Grudt and Glenn Jørgen Sandaker.

In 2008 there was judges who ranked super finalists so Mona Grundt and Glenn Jørgen Sandaker took the victory. Super final winners were chosen by judges depending by points and Skal vi danse? competition win a TV 2-pack.

Results of choosing to win in super finals.

Total results

1st result

Second Result

Third Result

See also
Skal vi danse?
Skal vi danse? (season 5)
Skal vi danse? (season 6)
Dancing with the Stars

References

External links

Skal vi danse 2008 – TV2

2008 Norwegian television seasons
Skal vi danse?